Avgeropoulos is a surname. Notable people with the surname include:

 Marie Avgeropoulos (born 1986), Canadian-Greek actress and model
 Yorgos Avgeropoulos (born 1971), Greek journalist and documentary filmmaker

Greek-language surnames